Palpidia pallidior is a species of moth in the family Erebidae.

Distribution
This species is found in Florida and Cuba.

Description
This moth has mottled brown forewings and white hind wings that are hidden when the moth is at rest.
The body is stout and the wingspan is about 35 mm.

Biology
The adult moths are probably nocturnal as are most noctuoids.  The larvae are probably foliage eaters but are not known as an agricultural pest.

References

External links
  Photos and Range Map

Moths described in 1898
Scolecocampinae